Chahar Zabar-e Olya (also Romanized as Chahār Zabar-e ‘Olyā; also known as Chahār Zabar, Chahār Zabar-e Bālā, Chahār Zīr-e ‘Olyā, and Chehār Zabar) is a village in Mahidasht Rural District, Mahidasht District, Kermanshah County, Kermanshah Province, Iran. At the 2006 census, its population was 173, in 37 families.

References 

Populated places in Kermanshah County